Lava Iris X9 is an android based smartphone from the manufacturer Lava mobiles. It is equipped with a quad-core processor. It includes features like 13 MP back camera and 8 MP front camera. Memory capacity of this mobile includes 2 GB RAM and 16 GB ROM. Input is given via touch screen.

References

Android (operating system) devices
Category:Mobile phones introduced in 2015